Alyzia is a former municipality in Aetolia-Acarnania, West Greece, Greece. Since the 2011 local government reform it is part of the municipality Xiromero, of which it is a municipal unit. It is located on the central west coast of Aetolia-Acarnania, near the island community of Kálamos. It has a land area of 148.719 km² and a population of 3,005 inhabitants at the 2011 census. Its municipal seat was the town of Kandila (pop. 1,048 in 2011). The other towns are Archontochori (Zaftsa) (pop. 701), Mytikas (759), Varnakas (342), and Panagoula (155).

Subdivisions
The municipal unit Alyzia is subdivided into the following communities (constituent villages in brackets):
Kandila
Archontochori (Archontochori, Agios Athanasios, Paliovarka) 
Mytikas 
Panagoula 
Varnakas

History
Ancient Alyzia was one of the most important cities of ancient Acarnania. According to Strabo, the city was named after Alyzeus, son of Icarius and brother of Penelope (Odysseus' wife).

Famous natives include the regent of Ptolemaic Egypt, Aristomenes of Alyzia (fl. 190s BC).

References

External links
Municipality of Alyzia 

Populated places in Aetolia-Acarnania